Frederick Hall (10 May 1923 – 28 November 1995) was a British actor.

His television credits include: Public Eye, Z-Cars, Doomwatch, Spy Trap, Survivors, The Enigma Files, Bergerac, Doctor Who (in the serial The Awakening) and Boon, as well as playing PC Fred Hallam in early episodes of Emmerdale Farm.

Filmography 

 Note: Some of the filmography details are pulled from the British Comedy Guide.

References

External links
 

1923 births
1995 deaths
British male television actors
20th-century English male actors